Trondra is one of the Scalloway Islands, a subgroup of the Shetland Islands in Scotland.

History
Trondra was becoming rapidly depopulated until 1970, when road bridges were built to neighbouring Burra (West and East) and to the southern peninsula of the Shetland Mainland. Since then the population has recovered from a low of 20 in 1961.

A local community hall was opened in 1986.

Composition
Settlements on the island include:

Burland - Burland houses one of Shetland's most popular tourist attractions - the Burland Croft Trail.
Cauldhame
Cutts
Glendale
Scarfataing

Geology
Trondra is made up of steeply inclined dalradian rocks; mainly quartz and mica rich schists but with some crystalline limestone in the north which provide fertile soils around Cauldhame and Cutts.  The hills are covered in grass and heather, with trees being few and far between, much like the rest of the Shetland Islands.

Wildlife
Trondra supports a number of seabirds including many gulls and black guillemots.

There are many fields of sheep and a few of Shetland ponies throughout the island.  There is a variety of other wildlife present on and around the isle, such as hedgehogs, sparrows, starlings, seals and porpoises.

Leisure activities
Trondra has 2 rowing teams, male and female, which compete in the summertime rowing regattas around Shetland and the annual 'Round Trondra Race'.

"Da Peerie Neep" ("The Wee Turnip") is a recently founded annual event which takes place in the Trondra hall and involves various neep related events such as "Toss the Neep".

Trondra usually enters a male and female squad in the Scalloway Fire Festival, which takes place in early January each year.

Footnotes

External links
Google Earth view

Islands of Shetland
Scalloway Islands